There have been a number of Four Power also called Quadripartite agreements and structures:

 The Four-Power Treaty, made at the  Washington Naval Conference November 1921 to February 1922.
 The Four-Power Pact was an international treaty initialed on June 7, 1933, signed on July 15, 1933.
 The Four Powers represented in the Allied Control Council as the military occupation governing body in Germany after the end of World War II.
 Four-Power Authorities, operated by the Allied Control Council
 Council of Foreign Ministers (When France joined the Council in 1946)
 The Four Power Agreement on Berlin signed on 3 September 1971